A list of social theorists includes classical as well as modern thinkers in social theory that were notable for the impact of their published works on the general discipline of sociology.

 Jane Addams
 Theodor Adorno
Muhammad Asad
 Roland Barthes
Peter L. Berger
 William Edward Burghardt Du Bois
 Pierre Bourdieu, 1930-2002
 Auguste Comte
 Charles Cooley
 Anna Julia Cooper
 Émile Durkheim
 Norbert Elias
 Friedrich Engels
 Amitai Etzioni
 Michel Foucault, 1926-1984
 Paulo Freire
 Ernest Gellner
 Charlotte Perkins Gilman
 Max Gluckman
 Erving Goffman, 1922-1982
 Antonio Gramsci
 Ludwig Gumplowicz
 Jürgen Habermas
 Prince Peter Kropotkin
 Henri Lefebvre
 Vladimir Lenin
Niklas Luhmann, 1927-1998
 György Lukács
 Rosa Luxemburg
 Jean-François Lyotard
 Karl Mannheim
 Harriet Martineau
 Karl Marx
 George Herbert Mead
 Robert King Merton
 John Stuart Mill
 Charles Wright Mills
 Vilfredo Pareto
 Robert Ezra Park
 Talcott Parsons
Claude Henri de Rouvroy, Comte de Saint-Simon
 Georg Simmel
 Dorothy E. Smith
 Pitirim A. Sorokin
 Herbert Spencer
 Rudolf Steiner
 William Graham Sumner
 Gabriel Tarde
 William Isaac Thomas
 Alexis de Tocqueville
 Ferdinand Tönnies
 Thorstein Veblen
Immanuel Wallerstein
Beatrice Webb
 Marianne Weber
 Max Weber

Theorists
Social theories